Sarmaya Arts Foundation is a not-for-profit curated repository of art, artefacts and living traditions from the Indian subcontinent. Founded by IndusInd Bank COO Paul Abraham in 2015, Sarmaya  is based in Mumbai, India.  Sarmaya is a digital museum with a physical collection that represents the diverse histories and artistic traditions of the Subcontinent. Objects in the collection fall into the categories of numismatics, cartography, photography, engravings, modern art, living traditions and rare books.

Collections 
The Sarmaya collection ranges from coins of the Gandhara age to Emperor Akbar’s gold mohur, a detailed map of the ancient dynasties that ruled India in 1022 AD, a selection of 19th century photographs presenting the first-ever portraits of India and triptych engraving of Tipu Sultan fighting the British army.

The genres in the collection are a mix of tribal and folk, including works by widely regarded genius of Gond art Jangarh Singh Shyam, as well as names like Phad painter Shrilal Joshi and Warli artist Jivya Soma Mhase. It also includes the works of Indian Modern masters like MF Husain, FN Souza and KH Ara, and an extensive body of works by Badri Narayan, AX Trindade and Jamini Roy.

A special project undertaken by Sarmaya founder Abraham has been the commission of Issa-nama : a miniature painting project depicting the life of Jesus Christ. The project has been undertaken in collaboration with miniature-painting artist Manish Soni in the Mughal painting style.

Special exhibitions 
Sarmaya's debut exhibition opened in January 2018 with Portrait of a Nation, a collection of rare 19th century photography from the Indian subcontinent. The show was curated by photographer Madhavan Pillai and designed by conservationist Abha Narain Lamba highlighted connections between the evolution of photography and the political landscape in India. Photographers featured included Raja Deen Dayal, Samuel Bourne, Felice Beato and Thomas Biggs.

References 

Archives in India
Arts organisations based in India
2015 establishments in Maharashtra
Museums in Mumbai